17 km is a rural locality (a selo) in Kelermesskoye Rural Settlement of Yuzhno-Sakhalinsk District, Sakhalin Oblast, Russia. The population was 0 as of 2010.

Streets 
There are no streets with titles.

References 

Rural localities in Sakhalin Oblast